Charlotte B. Ray (née Charlotte Augusta Burroughs; 25 October 1891) was an American prominent pastor, suffragist, and abolitionist. Charlotte was the second wife Charles Bennett Ray a revered African-American journalist. They were an active part of the Underground Railroad in Manhattan.

Biography 
Charlotte Augusta Burroughs was born around 1813, in Chatham County, Georgia, to African American parents Augustus Burroughs and Pacella. Many details of Charlotte's childhood are unknown.

Charlotte was a pastor for the New York's Bethesda Congregational Church. Her Christian faith fueled her activism to legalize women's right to vote, and protect African-American women who were predisposed to illness and disabilities resulting from slavery. Charlotte was also an active member in the American Equal Rights Association (AERA) and the American Anti-Slavery Society.

Ray died on October 25, 1891, and was buried in Cypress Hills Cemetery.

Marriage and children 
Charlotte relocated to New York City, where in 1840 she married Charles Bennett Ray. Together they had seven children. Four survived to adulthood:

 Clarence F. Ray (1848–?).
 Florence Theresa Ray (February 6, 1847 – June 15, 1920); no issue.
 Charlotte E. Ray (January 13, 1850 – January 4, 1911); no issue.
 Henrietta Cordelia Ray (August 30, 1852 – January 5, 1916); no issue.

All four of her children received a college education. Her daughter Charlotte F. was the first African-American woman to receive a law degree. Her eldest daughter Florence also became a attorney. Her youngest child Henrietta Cordelia became a famous poet.

See also 
 List of African-American abolitionists

References 

1813 births
1891 deaths
African-American suffragists
American suffragists
African-American abolitionists
People from Chatham County, Georgia
People from New York City
Underground Railroad people